Troy Township is one of the nineteen townships of Wood County, Ohio, United States.  The 2010 census found 3,870 people in the township, 2,858 of whom lived in the unincorporated portions of the township.

Geography
Located in the northeastern part of the county, it borders the following townships:
Lake Township - north
Clay Township, Ottawa County - northeast
Woodville Township, Sandusky County - east
Freedom Township - south
Webster Township - southwest
Perrysburg Township - northwest

The village of Luckey is located in southwestern Troy Township, and the unincorporated communities of Lemoyne and Stony Ridge lie in the township's north and northwest respectively.

Name and history
Troy Township was established in 1834. It is one of seven Troy Townships statewide.

Government
The township is governed by a three-member board of trustees, who are elected in November of odd-numbered years to a four-year term beginning on the following January 1. Two are elected in the year after the presidential election and one is elected in the year before it. There is also an elected township fiscal officer, who serves a four-year term beginning on April 1 of the year after the election, which is held in November of the year before the presidential election. Vacancies in the fiscal officership or on the board of trustees are filled by the remaining trustees.

References

External links
County website

Townships in Wood County, Ohio
Townships in Ohio